Benan may refer to:
 Saint Benan, an apostle of St. Patrick
 Teampull Bheanáin, an oratory on Inishmore, Galway Bay, Ireland
 Sheshi, a Hyksos king of Egypt's fifteenth dynasty